Hans Vollart Engström (24 February 1949 – 5 August 2014) was a Swedish actor. He was best known for his roles as Uno in the television soap opera Rederiet from 1992 until 2002. He also portrayed Jan in the drama film Mamma (1982). He primarily appeared in television films during his career.

Engström was born in Enskede near Stockholm. He died from liver failure on 5 August 2014 at the age of 65.

References

Other websites
 

1949 births
2014 deaths
Deaths from liver failure
Male actors from Stockholm
Swedish male film actors
Swedish male stage actors
Swedish male television actors